Phyllodytes is a genus of frogs (heart-tongued frogs) in the family Hylidae. It is endemic to eastern Brazil.

Taxonomy
Based on genetic evidence, genus Phytotriades was erected in 2009 to remedy polyphyly of Phyllodytes as then defined. It remains to be elucidated which Phyllodytes species, apart from Phytotriades (=Phyllodytes) auratus, the type species of the genus Phytotriades, might belong to Phytotriades instead of Phyllodytes. With Phytotriades auratus from Trinidad and Venezuela placed in its own genus, the remaining Phyllodytes species are all endemic to Brazil.

Description
These are small arboreal frogs which live and breed exclusively on epiphytic bromeliad plants. They have large odontoids ("fangs") on the dentaries. Male Phyllodytes do vocalize, in contrast to Phytotriades.

Species
This genus includes 14 species:

AmphibiaWeb continues to include Phytotriades auratus in this genus.

References

External links
  taxon Phyllodytes at http://www.eol.org.
  Taxon Phyllodytes at https://www.itis.gov/index.html.
  Taxon Phyllodytes at http://data.gbif.org/welcome.htm

 
Hylinae
Amphibians of South America
Endemic fauna of Brazil
Amphibian genera
Taxa named by Johann Georg Wagler